The Dagger is a 1999 Yugoslav war film directed by Miroslav Lekić. The film was written by Miroslav Lekić, Slobodan Stanojević and Igor Bojović. The plot is based on Vuk Drašković's novel of the same name.

Set in the 1960s and observed from the point of view of Alija Osmanović, a young Muslim medical student raised by a single mother, his entire family was slaughtered and his baby brother kidnapped by Chetniks during the Second World War, as the aftermath of a violent family feud between the Jugović (Christian) and Osmanović (Muslim) families.  He not only learns that the Osmanović family were once a branch of the Jugović family who converted to Islam during the Ottoman era, but that, unbeknownst to his mother, he himself was a baby taken from the Jugović family, after the massacre on Christmas Eve in 1942. With both families now extinct, and Alija, as the descendant of both, torn between two cultures and two identities, he struggles to maintain his inner peace, desperately searching for his long lost step-brother and fighting the prejudices against the romantic relationship he has with a Serbian classmate.

The film is based on fictive events of World War II and is centered on the atrocious crimes committed during that period, in particular the Jugović and Osmanović families.

In 1999, the film was screened at the 13th Montenegro Film Festival, and gained five featured awards. The film also earned the “Fipresci Award” for Directing, five acting awards in the Niš Film Festival and the “Crystal Star” at the Brussels Film Festival.

Cast 
 Žarko Laušević : Alija Osmanovic / Ilija Jugovic
 Bojana Maljević : Milica Jankovic
 Aleksandar Berček : Halil 'Sikter' Efendija
 Ljiljana Blagojević : Rabija Osmanovic
 Petar Božović : Sabahudin Aga / Atifaga Tanovic
 Velimir 'Bata' Zivojinovic : Nicifor Jugovic
 Nikola Kojo : Milan Vilenjak
 Svetozar Cvetković : Selim Osmanovic
 Josif Tatić : Kemal Osmanovic
 Dragan Nikolić : Hodza
 Dragan Maksimović : Zulfikar

References

External links 
 
 

1999 films
1990s war drama films
Serbian war drama films
Films set in Bosnia and Herzegovina
Films about race and ethnicity
Films set in Yugoslavia
1999 drama films
War films set in Partisan Yugoslavia
Serbian World War II films
Yugoslav World War II films
1990s Serbian-language films